Bernardyńska Street or Bernardines Street or  may refer to:

Bernardyńska Street (Bydgoszcz), Poland
, Poland
, Poland
, Poland

Disambiguation pages